Birkeniidae is an extinct family of jawless fish belonging to the order Birkeniiformes. They were defined in 1899 by Ramsay H. Traquair, and were a successful family among the many jawless fish in the Silurian seas.

Morphology 
Birkeniidae had a large body which was ovular in shape, and a strong, mobile tail. Their eyes were positioned on either side of the head. Their mouth was large for the jawless fish, but contained no teeth. Birkeniidae are distinguished by the crown shaped projection on their back, and the other smaller projections which run down its tail. They also possessed fins which faced downwards, an uncommon trait among the jawless fish. They had typical scaly skin.

References

External links 
 

Prehistoric jawless fish families
Birkeniiformes